Leonard Maguire (26 May 1924 – 12 September 1997) was a British actor, born in England but most renowned in Scotland where he lived for much of his life. Maguire had a long career, beginning in the 1940s. He died in 1997, aged 73, after a lengthy illness.

Early life
Maguire was born in Manchester, England, to Scottish parents.  His father was Thomas Maguire, a former consul in Valparaíso, Chile, who was of Irish descent. Maguire's family moved to Antwerp, Belgium in 1926 before moving to Glasgow, Scotland, in 1932. He was educated at St Mungo's Academy in Glasgow. Maguire was one of the founding members of the Glasgow Citizens Theatre in 1943, after being invalided out of the RAF during World War II. He began in the company as an Assistant Stage Manager with walk on parts.

Career
In 1945, he auditioned for and joined Laurence Olivier's company at the Phoenix Theatre in London, in a production of Thornton Wilder's The Skin of Our Teeth, starring Vivien Leigh. Other productions in which he was cast include Sheridan's The Rivals, starring Edith Evans, and a stage version of Crime and Punishment, starring John Gielgud.

He appeared on stage in numerous plays, including world premieres from Samuel Beckett and Dylan Thomas at the Edinburgh Festival. Maguire won the sought-after Fringe First award three years in a row for solo shows (1976, 1977, 1978); he was the only performer to accomplish this. During the fifteen years period from 1951, he presented nearly 2,000 radio programmes, which included Scope and Perspective. He was one of the hosts of the television arts programme Tempo in the 1960s.

Maguire appeared as the headmaster in school drama serial This Man Craig. Other television credits include: Dixon of Dock Green (1962); Dr. Finlay's Casebook (1963–1970); Z-Cars (1967); The Troubleshooters (1967); The Borderers (1969); Emmerdale Farm (1973); Whatever Happened to the Likely Lads? (1974); The Pallisers (1974); Doctor Who (1980); Rockliffe's Babies (1987); a recurring character in EastEnders as Lou Beale's friend "Uncle" (1986–1988); Rab C. Nesbitt (1990); Bergerac (1991), and Poirot (1993), among many others.

His film credits included The Awakening (1980), The Honorary Consul (1983), The Doctor and the Devils (1985), The Lonely Passion of Judith Hearne (1987), A Dry White Season (1989), and Prospero's Books (1991).

Personal life 
Maguire married radio producer Frances Campbell (1917–2008) in the 1960s. After his retirement, Maguire moved to France, settling in the village of Cordes-sur-Ciel, where he died in 1997 after a lengthy illness. He was aged 73. He was survived by his wife and their three children.

Filmography

References

External links 
 
 Leonard Maguire at Theatricalia

Scottish male soap opera actors
Scottish male television actors
Scottish male film actors
1924 births
1997 deaths
Male actors from Manchester
Male actors from Glasgow
Scottish people of Irish descent
Royal Air Force personnel of World War II
British expatriates in France
20th-century Scottish male actors